Reinholdt Christensen (3 March 1916 – 23 July 1999) was a Danish footballer. He played in one match for the Denmark national football team in 1938.

References

External links
 

1916 births
1999 deaths
Danish men's footballers
Denmark international footballers
Footballers from Copenhagen
Association football forwards
Hellerup IK players